Richard "Ricky" van den Bergh (born 17 November 1980 in The Hague) is a Dutch former footballer.

Club career
He previously played for Sparta Rotterdam (2002–2006), for whom he scored 54 goals in four seasons as well as RKC Waalwijk and Heracles Almelo.

ADO Den Haag
The hot-headed midfielder played for ADO Den Haag since the summer of 2009 in the Dutch highest league, Eredivisie. Van den Bergh is infamous for hitting the bar from free kicks. In his last season at Heracles Almelo, he hit the bar six times, after the first nine matches at ADO Den Haag he had already got three hits. On 5 April 2010 in the game against Ajax Amsterdam played since the 75 minute between the final whistle as goalkeeper, who replaced Barry Ditewig who was shown the red card in the 74th minute.

Sparta Rotterdam
On 8 December 2010 it was announced that Van den Bergh's contract with ADO Den Haag was terminated, because of a disagreement about his number of matches. On 14 December 2010 he signed with Sparta Rotterdam until the end of the season.

References

1980 births
Living people
Footballers from The Hague
Dutch footballers
Association football forwards
RKC Waalwijk players
Sparta Rotterdam players
Heracles Almelo players
ADO Den Haag players
SV Spakenburg players
Eredivisie players
Eerste Divisie players